YTO may refer to:

 Yto Barrada (born 1971), Franco-Moroccan multimedia visual artist
 YTO Cargo Airlines, a Chinese cargo airline
 YTO Group, a manufacturing company based in China
 Willow Run Transmission, motor vehicle factory also known as Ypsilanti Transmission Operations or YTO
 YTO (IATA), a multiple airport code (IATA) for the Greater Toronto Area, Ontario, Canada

See also